Jacky Avril (born 19 July 1964 in Vierzon) is a French slalom canoeist who competed from the mid-1980s to the early 1990s. He won the bronze medal in the C1 event at the 1992 Summer Olympics in Barcelona.

Avril also won four medals at the ICF Canoe Slalom World Championships with three silvers (C1 team: 1987, 1989, 1991) and one bronze (C1: 1991).

World Cup individual podiums

References
DatabaseOlympics.com

1964 births
Canoeists at the 1992 Summer Olympics
French male canoeists
Living people
Olympic canoeists of France
Olympic bronze medalists for France
Olympic medalists in canoeing
Medalists at the 1992 Summer Olympics
Medalists at the ICF Canoe Slalom World Championships
20th-century French people